Ambu is an Italian surname. Notable people with the surname include:

Antonio Ambu (born 1936), Italian long-distance runner
Claudio Ambu (born 1958), Italian football player

Italian-language surnames